The 2008 Virslīga season was the 17th Virslīga  season. It began on 5 April 2008 with the first round of games and ended on 9 November 2008 with the final matches of the championship and relegation rounds. Ventspils were the defending champions.

Season details

For the 2008 season the league has expanded to ten clubs, and the fixture format has changed. Due to expansion there was no relegation at the end of the 2007 season, and the top two clubs from the 1. līga 2007 season, champions FK Vindava (from Ventspils), and second placed SK Blāzma (from Rēzekne) were both promoted. From the 2008 season on, the league will be held in two rounds.

In the first round each club played all the other nine clubs twice, home and away starting with Matchday 1 on 5 April and finishing with Matchday 18 on 10 August.

In the second round there were two "mini leagues", with the top six clubs after the First Round, playing each other twice and clubs in 7th to 10th place after the First Round playing each other four times. Second round matches started on 24 August and finished on 9 November.

At the end of the season, the club finishing bottom of the Virslīga were automatically relegated to the 1. līga, and the champions of the 1. līga were automatically promoted, taking the place of the relegated club. The club that finished next to the bottom in the Virslīga play a two-legged playoff for the final place in the Virslīga for the next season with the club that finished second in 1. līga.

First round

Standings

Results

Second round

Championship round

Standings

Results

Relegation round

Standings

Results

Relegation play-offs
Blāzma Rēzekne, the 9th placed team in the Virslīga, and 1. līga runners-up, Tranzīts Ventspils, competed in a two-legged play-off for a spot in the Virslīga 2009. Blāzma Rēzekne won 6–1 on aggregate and thereby kept their spot in the next season of the Virslīga.

Topscorers

References

External links
 Latvian Football Federation 
 Latvian Football Federation news in English

Latvian Higher League seasons
1
Latvia
Latvia